The discography of Guy Sebastian, an Australian singer, consists of nine studio albums, one compilation album, one live album, three EPs and 53 singles, including six as a featured artist and four charity singles. Sebastian won the first series of Australian Idol in 2003, and gained a record deal with Sony BMG. He has released ten albums which peaked in the top six of the ARIA Charts, including three which reached number one. The first seven achieved either platinum or multi-platinum certification. He has also released twenty three top twenty singles in Australia, with fourteen reaching the top ten, including six number ones. Sebastian is the only Australian male artist in Australian chart history to achieve six number-one singles, and is third overall for all Australian acts with only Kylie Minogue and Delta Goodrem having achieved more. He has also reached the top ten of the New Zealand charts with an album and six singles, including two number ones. Sebastian has sixty-nine platinum and seven gold certifications in Australia, the highest number for an Australian Idol contestant. "Battle Scars", a collaboration with Lupe Fiasco, spent 20 weeks in the Billboard Hot 100 chart, peaking at number 71 and achieving platinum certification. It also reached number 2 in Norway.

Sebastian's debut single "Angels Brought Me Here" and album Just as I Am both reached number one on the ARIA charts. "Angels Brought Me Here" was the highest selling song in Australia last decade. The first week sales of 163,711 for Just as I Am were at the time the highest one-week sales ever achieved in Australia, and have since only been surpassed by Susan Boyle's debut album in 2009. With eventual sales of 480,000, just short of 7× platinum, Just as I Am is the highest selling album ever released by an Australian Idol contestant. The second single "All I Need Is You" also reached number one. Sebastian's next two albums were certified platinum. Beautiful Life showcased a stronger contemporary R&B sound and reached number two with a number-one lead single, "Out with My Baby", and two other top twenty singles. Closer to the Sun was a mix of genres, including pop rock, soul, and jazz. It peaked at number four and produced a top ten and top twenty single.

The Memphis Album was a cover album of soul classics recorded in Memphis with Steve Cropper and other members of American soul band the MGs. It peaked at number three and gained a double platinum certification. Like It Like That, which showed the influences of Sebastian's Memphis soul period, reached number six and platinum certification. The title track "Like It Like That" peaked at number one and was the highest selling Australian artist song of 2009. "Art of Love", featuring Jordin Sparks, peaked in the top ten. Twenty Ten was a retrospective album with songs from Sebastian's previous albums, two new songs and ten acoustic tracks. It peaked at number four and was certified double platinum. The album's only single "Who's That Girl", featuring US rapper Eve, reached number one.

Sebastian's seventh and eighth albums were mixtures of soul, R&B and pop. Armageddon peaked at number one and was certified double platinum. The album was the second highest selling album by an Australian artist in 2012. Four top ten singles were released from the album, including "Battle Scars" which reached number one and was the highest selling Australian artist single of 2012. Sebastian's eighth album Madness reached number six and has been certified gold. The album produced a top ten and three top twenty singles.

Albums

Studio albums

Compilation albums

Live albums

Extended plays

Singles

As lead artist

As featured artist

Charity singles

Other appearances

Music videos

Notes

References

External links

Official website

Discographies of Malaysian artists
Discographies of Australian artists
Pop music discographies
Rhythm and blues discographies